The Men's 5000 metres competition at the 2019 World Single Distances Speed Skating Championships was held on 7 February 2019.

Results
The race was started at 17:54.

References

Men's 5000 metres